Thomas Lowry (February 27, 1843 – February 4, 1909) was an American lawyer, real-estate magnate, and businessman who oversaw much of the early growth of the streetcar lines in the Twin Cities area of Minneapolis, St. Paul, and surrounding communities in Minnesota.  He became head of the Minneapolis Street Railway Co., later to become part of Twin City Rapid Transit (TCRT). He is not known to be a relative of Sylvanus Lowry, the slaveholder and profiteer of slavery-related enterprise from St. Cloud, Minnesota.

Lowry was born in Logan County, Illinois, and came to Minneapolis in 1867 after passing the bar to become a lawyer.  He set up shop and quickly found much of his work to be related to real-estate deals.  Soon, real-estate became his primary focus.  In 1875, he was recruited to join the Minneapolis Street Railway, which was rushing to begin operations.  Two years later, in 1877, he had a controlling interest in the company.  He managed the company and organized finances, while his brother-in-law Calvin Gibson Goodrich handled other details.  In the early days, Lowry spent a lot of time arranging loans so the railway could be expanded.  Lowry had the idea to extend rails out into areas that had not yet been developed, much of that land being owned by him.

His company merged with the rail line of St. Paul after the first "interurban" line connected the Twin Cities.  The merger became effective at the beginning of 1892.  In 1898, TCRT began building a number of its own streetcars, rather than purchasing them from other companies.  The first one of these was a special car for Lowry that had large window panes at one end so that he could see more as the car traveled through the region.  It was used by the company on several special occasions, and United States President William McKinley made use of it on a visit to Minneapolis around 1900.

Lowry also served as president of what would become Soo Line Railroad from 1889 to 1890 and again from 1892 to 1909.

Lowry married Beatrice Goodrich.  The couple had a son, Horace Lowry, on February 4, 1880.  Horace would eventually follow in his father's footsteps, becoming president of Twin City Rapid Transit until his death on August 22, 1931. Lowry Sr. was a member and benefactor of the First Universalist Church of Minneapolis (a.k.a. Church of the Redeemer).

Several sites in Minneapolis are named for Lowry because of his efforts to expand the rail system in the area.  A memorial by Karl Bitter was dedicated to him at the intersection of Lyndale and Hennepin Avenue in 1915.  Originally, the memorial was meant to serve as a welcome to the southwest neighborhoods of Minneapolis.  The statue was moved to Smith Triangle Park on Hennepin Avenue in the 1960s due to the construction of the Lowry Hill Tunnel, which reconfigured the Hennepin/Lyndale intersection. Thomas Lowry Park is located at Douglas and Mount Curve Avenues in Lowry Hill, also in memorial of Thomas Lowry.

References
 Russel L. Olson (1976).  The Electric Railways of Minnesota.  Minnesota Transportation Museum, Hopkins/H. M. Smyth Co., St. Paul.

External links
Image of the Thomas Lowry Memorial commencement in 1915

Thomas Lowry in MNopedia, the Minnesota Encyclopedia

1843 births
1909 deaths
Businesspeople from Illinois
Businesspeople from Minneapolis
19th-century American railroad executives
Soo Line Railroad
People from Logan County, Illinois
Burials at Lakewood Cemetery
Lawyers from Minneapolis